George Aitchison Jr. RA (London 7 November 1825 – 16 May 1910) was a British architect.

He was the son of George Aitchison (1792–1861) who was educated at Merchant Taylors' School and University College London and articled to architect Henry Hake Seward from 1813 to 1823.

His best-known work is Leighton House, Kensington, for Baron Leighton.

He became an associate member of the Royal Academy of Arts in 1881 and a full member in 1898, and was Professor of Architecture there from 1887 to 1905.  He became a member of the Royal Institute of British Architects in 1862 and was its President from 1896 to 1899. He won the Royal Gold Medal in 1898.

References

External links
 
 
 
 

1825 births
1910 deaths
Architects from London
Recipients of the Royal Gold Medal
Members of the Royal Academy of Belgium
Presidents of the Royal Institute of British Architects
Royal Academicians
People educated at Merchant Taylors' School, Northwood